Vacuum is the absence of matter.

Vacuum may also refer to:

Vacuum cleaner, a home appliance which uses suction to remove dirt
 Vacuum flask, an insulated storage vessel
 Vacuum (outer space), the very high, but imperfect, vacuum of the solar system and interstellar space
 Ultra-high vacuum
 Vacuum state, the quantum state with the lowest possible energy
 Vacuum Oil Company, an 1866 US petroleum company, now part of ExxonMobil
 Vacuum (band), a musical group from Sweden 
 The Vacuum, a free monthly newspaper published in Belfast, Northern Ireland
Vacuum, a 2006 play by Deborah McAndrew
Vacuum, a 2004 album by The Watch
 VACUUM, a data set clean-up process

simple:Vacuum